Jean-Pierre Cantegrit (born 2 July 1933) is a member of the Senate of France, representing French citizens living abroad. He is a member of the Union for a Popular Movement.

References
Page on the Senate website 

1933 births
Living people
Union for a Popular Movement politicians
French Senators of the Fifth Republic
Senators of French citizens living abroad
Place of birth missing (living people)